Nikolayevka is a rural locality (a settlement) in Boronsky Selsoviet, Suyetsky District, Altai Krai, Russia. The population was 27 as of 2013. There is 1 street.

Geography 
Nikolayevka is located 25 km south of Verkh-Suyetka (the district's administrative centre) by road. Boronsky is the nearest rural locality.

References 

Rural localities in Suyetsky District